Shippey is a surname. Notable people with the surname include:

Lee Shippey (1884–1969), American author and journalist
Samuel Shippey (born 1937), British cricketer
Tom Shippey (born 1943), British literary scholar, especially of J. R. R. Tolkien
Tony Shippey (born 1939), English cricketer